George Lathan (5 August 1875 – 14 June 1942) was a British trade unionist and politician. He was the Member of Parliament (MP) for Sheffield Park from 1929 to 1931 and from 1935 until his death.

Lathan worked on the railways where he became an active trade unionist and joined the Independent Labour Party.  He became president of the Railway Clerks Association from 1906 until 1912, when he became its chief assistant secretary, a post he held until 1937.

Lathan also joined the Labour Party, and at the 1918 general election, stood unsuccessfully in Watford.  From 1921 until 1936, Lathan was a member of the Railways National Wages Board.  From 1921 until 1937, he was the president of the National Federation of Professional Workers.

Lathan was a parliamentary candidate at successive general elections. In 1922 he was defeated in Enfield, then in 1923 and 1924 he stood in Sheffield Park, finally winning the seat in 1929.  He lost the seat in 1931, but retook it in 1935.  He served as the chairman of the Labour Party National Executive Committee in 1931/2 and party treasurer from 1936 until his death.

References
Michael Stenton and Stephen Lees, Who's Who of British MPs: Volume III, 1919-1945
Single or Return - the official history of the Transport Salaried Staffs' Association

External links 
 

1875 births
1942 deaths
British trade unionists
Politics of Sheffield
UK MPs 1929–1931
UK MPs 1935–1945
Labour Party (UK) MPs for English constituencies
Chairs of the Labour Party (UK)
Transport Salaried Staffs' Association-sponsored MPs
Presidents of the Transport Salaried Staffs' Association